Claude Ruel (September 12, 1938 – February 9, 2015) was a professional ice hockey coach for the Montreal Canadiens of the National Hockey League (NHL).

Ruel grew up playing hockey in Sherbrooke. He was considered to be a promising young defensive talent, despite his diminutive stature. However, during a game in 1958, he was struck in the eye by a deflected puck. Following the injury, he was hospitalized for three months, but his eyesight could not be restored.

In the early 1960s, Ruel received his first coaching job, taking a position with the Montreal Junior Canadiens. He became a key part of the Montreal farm system, serving as one of the team's top scouts. He later was elevated to the front office of the NHL club and served as director of player development.

Ruel was hired to coach the Habs in 1968, replacing the legendary Toe Blake. He led a talented group of players to a Stanley Cup championship during his first year. However, the following season, Montreal was the odd team out in a tight, five-team "Original Six" battle for four playoff spots. He started the 1970-71 season behind the bench, but decided to step down 23 games into the season because the pressure of life behind the bench was affecting his health. He subsequently returned to his role director of player development, but he took over as Montreal coach again in 1979, leading the team for one and a half years during the waning days of the 1970s dynasty.
Ruel died on February 9, 2015.

Coaching record

References

External links

Claude Ruel profile at the Montreal Canadiens historical site

1938 births
2015 deaths
Canadian ice hockey coaches
French Quebecers
Ice hockey people from Quebec
Montreal Canadiens coaches
Montreal Canadiens executives
Montreal Canadiens scouts
Sportspeople from Sherbrooke
Stanley Cup champions
Stanley Cup championship-winning head coaches